Maya Nassar (born October 3, 1986) is a Dutch-Lebanese competitive fitness model, TV host, brand ambassador, and entrepreneur.

Early life 
Nassar was born in Long Island, New York to a Lebanese father and a Dutch mother. She grew up in Nigeria during her early childhood and later spent several years living in England, before finally moving to Lebanon during her high school years.

Career 
At the 2014 Pure Elite UK Championships endorsed by the Lebanese Ministry of Youth and Sports she earned first place for the Bikini Babe category. In 2018, Nassar triumphed at the Pure Elite Diamond Competition. She earned 1st place for Bikini Beach Body.

Charities 
Nassar is a board member at Animals Lebanon, an animal welfare non-profit organization. She works with Maryam and Martha Association, an NGO catered to help women who have sought refuge in shelters.

Personal life 
Nassar has two children with her husband. They reside in Beirut.

References 

Living people
1986 births
People from Long Island
Lebanese female athletes
Fitness and figure competitors